Mount Horeb Baptist Church is a historic Baptist church located near Mineola, Montgomery County, Missouri. It was built in 1897, and is a one-story, rectangular frame building with gable roof.  It measures 28 feet, 3 inches, by 46 feet, 5 inches, and houses a single room.  The church is representative of rural Baptist congregations in Mid-Missouri.

It was listed on the National Register of Historic Places in 1980.

References

Baptist churches in Missouri
Churches on the National Register of Historic Places in Missouri
Churches completed in 1897
Buildings and structures in Montgomery County, Missouri
National Register of Historic Places in Montgomery County, Missouri
1897 establishments in Missouri